Clubul Sportiv Municipal Focșani, commonly known as CSM Focșani, is a men's handball club from Focșani, Vrancea County, Romania, that plays in the Liga Națională. The club promoted for the very first time in the Liga Națională in 2015. At the end of the 2017–18 season the club managed to avoid relegation and finished on the 10th place.

CSM plays its home matches in the Sala Sporturilor "Vrancea", a sports hall which was built in 1975 with a capacity of 1,400 people.

History

 2007 - Year of establishment as CSM Focșani
 2015 - First promotion to the Liga Națională

Kits

Current roster 
Squad for the 2020–21 season

Goalkeepers
  Emilian Marocico  
  Marius Cloasca
  Robert Rusu
Wingers
RW
  Mihaita Miroiu
  George Nutu
LW
  Filip Marjanovic
  Valentin Mocanu
Line players
  Rață Bogdan Cătălin
  Didi Hrimiuc
  George Gramatic

Back players
LB
  Roman Makrishin
  Madalin Tutu
  Tiberiu Popovici  
CB
  Sasa Marjanovic
  Valentin Patru
  Goran Krstevski
RB
  Bogdan Manescu
  Marius Ragea
  Atilla Eros

References

External links
 Official website

Romanian handball clubs
Focșani
Handball clubs established in 2007
2007 establishments in Romania
Liga Națională (men's handball)